Psychic (adjective) qualities are those relating to the mind or soul.

A psychic (noun) is someone who claims to possess paranormal or supernatural capabilities.

Psychic or The Psychic may also refer to:

Movies
 Psychic, a 1992 Soviet science fiction film
 Psychic, a 1991 film with Zach Galligan
 Psychic, a 2018 short directed by Irish actor Brendan Gleeson
 Sette note in nero, a 1977 Italian film released in the US as The Psychic

Episodes
 "The Psychic", a 1967 episode from the first season of Mission: Impossible
 "The Psychic", a 1977 episode from the second season of Starsky & Hutch
 "The Psychic", a 1980 episode from the third season of The Incredible Hulk (1978 TV series)
 "The Psychic", a 1981 episode from the seventh season of Barney Miller
 "The Psychic", a 1985 episode from the fifth season of Cagney & Lacey
 "The Psychic", a two-part 1986 episode from the third season of Amen
 "The Psychic", a 1990 episode from the fifth season of Street Legal

Other uses
 Psychic (album), a 2013 album by Darkside
 "Psychic", a 2006 song by Vanessa Hudgens from her debut album V
 "Psychic", a 2022 song by Chris Brown from his album Breezy

See also

 
 Psych (disambiguation)
 Psyche (disambiguation)
 Psycho (disambiguation)
 Psychedelic (disambiguation)
 Physic (disambiguation)
 Physics (disambiguation)
 Physical (disambiguation)
 Sidekick (disambiguation)